Scapanorhynchus (from  , 'shovel' and   'snout') is an extinct genus of shark that lived from the early Cretaceous until possibly the Miocene if S. subulatus is a mitsukurinid and not a sand shark.  Their extreme similarities to the living goblin shark, Mitsukurina owstoni, lead some experts to consider reclassifying it as Scapanorhynchus owstoni.  However, most shark specialists regard the goblin shark to be distinct enough from its prehistoric relatives to merit placement in its own genus.

Scapanorhynchus had an elongated, albeit flattened snout and sharp awl-shaped teeth ideal for seizing fish, or tearing chunks of flesh from its prey. It was a small shark normally measuring about 65 cm, though the largest species, S. texanus, is thought to have reached up to 3 m (10 ft) in length, about the size of a modern goblin shark. The largest teeth reported from this genus are anterior teeth from S. texanus, which can reach lengths up to 7 cm.

References

Further reading 
 Case, G and Schwimmer, D., 1998. Late Cretaceous fish from the Blufftown Formation (Campanian) in Western Georgia. Journal of Paleontology., 62(2). pp 290–301.
 Kent, B., 1994. Fossil Sharks of the Chesapeake Region. Egan Rees & Boyer, Maryland. 146 pp

Mitsukurinidae
Prehistoric shark genera
Cretaceous sharks
Paleogene sharks
Miocene sharks
Cretaceous fish of Asia
Fossils of Uzbekistan
Bissekty Formation
Late Cretaceous fish of North America
Mooreville Chalk